Sachdev is a Hindu and Sikh Arora surname, from Sanskrit Satya 'true' + deva 'god, lord'.

Notable people with the surname include:

 Achala Sachdev (1920–2012), Indian film actress
 Asha Sachdev, Indian film actress
 Avinash Sachdev (born 1986), Indian television actor
 G. S. Sachdev, Indian bansuri performer
 Manoj Sachdev, Canadian engineer
 Padma Sachdev (1940–2021), Indian poet and novelist
 Perminder Sachdev (born 1956), neuropsychiatrist
 Prashant Raj Sachdev, Indian actor and model
 Rajeshwari Sachdev (born 1975), Indian film actress
 Shivshakti Sachdev (born 1993), Indian television actress
 Sonali Sachdev, Indian actress
 Subir Sachdev, physics professor
 Sumeet Sachdev, Indian actor
 Tania Sachdev (born 1986), Indian chess player
 Taruni Sachdev (1998–2012), Indian actress
 Sanjay Sachdeva (born 1974), orthodontist
 Mihir Sachdev (born 1990), National handball player- Haryana

References

Indian surnames
Surnames of Indian origin
Punjabi-language surnames
Hindu surnames
Khatri clans
Khatri surnames
Arora clans